Subway is a 1985 French thriller film directed by Luc Besson and starring Isabelle Adjani and Christopher Lambert. The film is classified as part of the cinéma du look movement.

Plot
The movie opens with Fred being chased by several gangsters; it's later explained that he stole some documents from their boss at his wife Héléna's birthday party. Fred escapes into the labyrinthine world of the Paris Métro. Over the next several days he attempts to blackmail Héléna for the documents, although he is clearly less interested in the money than in winning her affection.

Meanwhile, the gangsters and police continue searching for Fred, as well as his new friend "The Skater" (who has been living off minor theft and avoiding the police for many months). Héléna struggles with her feelings about Fred and her dissatisfaction as her (much older) husband's arm candy. Gradually, Fred meets musicians and persuades them to join a band he claims to be forming (although he himself cannot sing). The full cast of characters is large; most of their lives and personalities are developed only implicitly from their context and mannerisms.

Cast
Isabelle Adjani as Héléna Kerman
Christopher Lambert (as Christophe Lambert) as Fred
Richard Bohringer as The Florist
Michel Galabru as Commissioner Gesberg
Jean-Hugues Anglade as The Roller
Jean Bouise as The Station Master
Jean-Pierre Bacri as Inspector Batman
Jean-Claude Lecas as Robin
Pierre-Ange Le Pogam as Jean
Jean Reno as The Drummer
Éric Serra as Enrico (bassist)
Arthur Simms as Paul (singer)

Production
Subway was filmed partially on location in the Paris Métro and Paris RER, and partially on sets that were designed by Alexandre Trauner. The opening car chase scene is said to pay homage to the 1971 film The French Connection, and the film's ending is based loosely on the ending of the 1960 film Breathless.

Soundtrack
Éric Serra's score and other musical pieces from the soundtrack, such as Fred's band's song, "It's Only Mystery" (also written by Serra), were released on vinyl and cassette in 1985.  The soundtrack sold over 100,000 copies in France. The soundtrack was released on CD in 1996.

Reception
Subway was the third-most popular French film in France in 1986, after Trois Hommes et un Couffin and Les Specialistes. It attracted 2,920,588 cinemagoers. The film grossed $390,659 at the box office in the United States.

The film holds an 67% rating on Rotten Tomatoes, based on nine reviews. Janet Maslin of The New York Times praised the film's "highly energetic visual style" and "the sheer fun of staging domestic scenes, musical interludes and roller-skate chases in the underground" but added that "[the] characters and situations [are] so thin that they might as well be afterthoughts".

Accolades
Subway was nominated for the Foreign Language Film award at the 40th British Academy Film Awards. The film was nominated for 13 César Awards in 1986, winning 3: Best Actor (Christopher Lambert), Best Production Design (Alexander Trauner) and Best Sound.

Home media
The film was released on DVD in the United States in November 2001. The DVD presents the film in 2.35:1 anamorphic widescreen and contains both an English-dubbed version as well as the original French version with English subtitles.  Aaron Beierle of DVD Talk gave the DVD 3 out of 5 stars for video quality, and 2½ stars for audio quality. Jason Bovberg of DVD Talk gave the film 3 stars for both video and audio quality. Both reviewers gave the film only a ½ star for its extra features, noting only cast and crew biographies plus trailers for three of Besson's other films were included on the disc. As well as having no special features, standard versions of the DVD only contain the English-dubbed version; this has significant dialogue differences from the French original, though both Lambert and Adjani performed their own English.

Both the UK and French versions of the Blu-ray were released in September 2009. Both only contained the film in its original French audio, though with optional English subtitles. Blu-ray.com awarded both 3½ out of 5 stars for both audio and video quality.

References

Bibliography

External links

1985 films
1985 thriller films
Films directed by Luc Besson
Films featuring a Best Actor César Award-winning performance
Films produced by Luc Besson
Films scored by Éric Serra
Films set in Paris
Films shot in Paris
Films with screenplays by Luc Besson
French thriller films
Gaumont Film Company films
Rail transport films
1980s French films